Mehrdad Yeghaneh (born 22 January 1992) is an Iranian footballer for Niroye Zamini in the Azadegan League as a defender. He previously played in the Iran Pro League and Paykan F.C. team. Yeghaneh was with the youth national team of the AFC U-16 Championship, went to 2009 FIFA U-17 World Cup and with the national team until the ascent 1/16.

International
Iran U-17
AFC U-16 Championship (1): 2008

References

 
 Mehrdad Yeghaneh in Persian Gulf Pro League

1992 births
Living people
Iranian footballers
Sportspeople from Tabriz
Paykan F.C. players
Iran under-20 international footballers
Association football defenders
Niroye Zamini players
Sepahan S.C. footballers
Tractor S.C. players
Gostaresh Foulad F.C. players